Jörg Scherbe (born 19 October 1977) is a German former professional footballer who played as a midfielder.

Career
Scherbe made his debut on the professional league level in the 2. Bundesliga for KFC Uerdingen 05 on 25 May 1997 when he came on as a half-time substitute for René Schmidt in a game against Mainz 05. He was sent off later in that game.

External links
 

1977 births
Living people
German footballers
Association football midfielders
KFC Uerdingen 05 players
TSV 1860 Munich players
FC Energie Cottbus players
Rot-Weiß Oberhausen players
SV 19 Straelen players
Bundesliga players
Sportspeople from Cottbus
Footballers from Brandenburg